= Antithemerastis =

Scientific classification
- Kingdom: Animalia
- Phylum: Arthropoda
- Clade: Pancrustacea
- Class: Insecta
- Order: Lepidoptera
- Superfamily: Noctuoidea
- Family: Notodontidae
- Genus: Antithemerastis; Kiriakoff, 1968

Genus of moths

Antithemerastis is a genus of moths in the family Notodontidae. It was first described by Sergius Kiriakoff in 1968. The type species is Antithemerastis acrobela.

== Species ==
There are two species in the genus:

- A. acrobela Turner, 1922
- A. hendersoni Kiriakoff, 1970
